The Minardi M187 was a Formula One car designed by Giacomo Caliri built by Minardi for the 1987 Formula One season. The car was driven by Spanish driver Adrian Campos and Italian Alessandro Nannini. Using the M187, Minardi scored no points during the course of the season.

Race history
Nannini was consistently better performed than both the car and the overweight, underpowered Motori Moderni V6 turbo. He was let down by the car and finished only three races during the season. The chain smoking Italian did not score any points for the season but most agreed that was more the car than driver and his performances for Benetton from 1988 to 1990 would back this up.

Unfortunately the same could not be said for Campos who brought considerably more money to the team than Formula One standard driving talent and it was noted by many, including BBC commentator Murray Walker on a number of occasions, that Campos was out of his depth in Grand Prix racing. The Spaniard was disqualified in the opening race in Brazil for passing cars to take his grid position after stalling at the start of the warm-up lap. He did not start in Monaco due to a crash before the start, and recorded his only finish for the season when he finished 14th (four laps behind winner Nigel Mansell) in his home race in Spain.

The M187 was the last Minardi to use the Motori Moderni engine.

Livery 
The M187 retained the black and yellow colour scheme from the previous seasons, with sponsorship from Simod. The signing of Campos as a driver also brought sponsorship from the Spanish jeans company Lois.

Complete Formula One results
(key)

References

1987 Formula One season cars
Minardi Formula One cars